Stéphanie Jiménez (born 17 December 1974) is an Andorran mountain runner and skyrunner naturalised Italian.

Biography
Jiménez was born in Albi, France. She has competed in the Buff Skyrunner World Series since 2006, finishing in the top five in the championship on every occasion. Her first race victory was in 2007, when she won the OSJ Ontake SkyRace at Mount Ontake, Japan.

She lives in Sterzing, South Tyrol, Italy.

National titles
Italian Vertical Kilometer Championships (FISKY version)
Vertical kilometer: 2014

References

External links 
 Further results

1974 births
Living people
Andorran mountain runners
Andorran sky runners
Italian female mountain runners
Italian sky runners